Vicente Gómez, born in Honduras, was President of El Salvador from 1 to 15 February 1854.

Presidents of El Salvador
Year of death missing
Year of birth missing